This is a list of urban areas in the Republic of Ireland by population. The one hundred largest towns are listed below. Populations are from the 2016 Irish census and represent the entire settlement area of each town and city (including suburbs and environs). For convenience, all cities included are shown in bold.

Cities and towns list

See also
List of towns and villages in the Republic of Ireland
List of towns in the Republic of Ireland/2002 Census Records
List of towns in the Republic of Ireland/2006 Census Records
List of localities in Northern Ireland by population
List of settlements on the island of Ireland by population

Notes

References

External links
 List of Largest towns in Ireland
 2011 census report

Ireland
 
Urban